Graham Douglas Leonard  (8 May 1921 – 6 January 2010) was an English Roman Catholic priest and former Anglican bishop. His principal ministry was as a bishop of the Church of England but, after his retirement as the Bishop of London, he became a Roman Catholic, becoming the most senior Anglican cleric to do so since the English Reformation. He was conditionally ordained to the priesthood in the Roman Catholic Church and was later appointed a monsignor by Pope John Paul II.

Early life
Born on 8 May 1921, Leonard was the son of Douglas Leonard, an Anglican priest, and his wife Emily Leonard (née Cheshire). He was educated at Monkton Combe School near Bath and at Balliol College, Oxford. During the Second World War he was commissioned into the Oxfordshire and Buckinghamshire Light Infantry, rising to the rank of captain. He spent the latter part of the war attached to the Army Operational Research Group for the Ministry of Supply. He then attended Westcott House theological college in Cambridge. He was ordained as a deacon in 1947 and as a priest the following year.

Early ministry
Leonard was a curate in St Ives, Huntingdonshire, and at Stansted, Essex. He then spent three years as vicar of Ardleigh, Essex. In 1957 he became a residentiary canon of St Albans Cathedral and the diocesan director of religious education. His long association with the Diocese of London began in 1962 when, before becoming the Bishop of Willesden (a suffragan bishopric in the diocese) in 1964, he was appointed as Archdeacon of Hampstead and as rector of St Andrew Undershaft with St Mary Axe in the City of London.

Episcopal ministry
Leonard had three episcopal positions in the Church of England, firstly as the suffragan Bishop of Willesden in the Diocese of London and later as the diocesan Bishop of Truro (1973 to 1981) and the Bishop of London (1981 to 1991). During this last period he was also Dean of the Chapel Royal, a Royal Household office, for which he was appointed Knight Commander of the Royal Victorian Order (KCVO). He was also Prelate of the Order of the British Empire.

As the Bishop of London, Leonard was admired for his pastoral concern for female staff at Church House and had a considerable number of female workers in parishes in his diocese. He was notable for ordaining 71 women as deacons at St Paul's Cathedral on 22 March 1987, but he remained an outspoken critic of moves to ordain women to the priesthood within the Anglican Communion.

In 1989, Leonard co-authored a book titled Let God be God with two Anglican theologians examining the issue of inclusive language in the church, giving particular attention to inclusive God language, of which they were especially critical:
this God and Lord ... is revealed to us as Father, Son and Holy Spirit. Try as we may, we cannot see how we can accept God's self-revelation without also accepting that God has chosen to use certain male symbols and male language to express to us the kind of God 'he' is. To cease to use these terms is, to us, to discard that revelation."

Ordination in the Roman Catholic Church
After his retirement Leonard eventually left the Church of England to become a Roman Catholic. On 23 April 1994 he was conditionally ordained as a priest (but not as a bishop) in the Roman Catholic Church. Although the Roman Catholic Church does not recognise the validity of Anglican ordinations, Leonard's ordination was conditional due to there being "prudent doubt" about his previous ordination in the Church of England, because at Leonard's own consecration in 1964 a bishop of an Old Catholic church of the Union of Utrecht (whose own ordination as a bishop was recognised as valid by the Roman Catholic Church) was among the bishops who consecrated him. This eased his reception into the Roman Catholic Church, although his claim that he was legitimately a bishop and his request for a personal prelature were rejected.

Leonard stated that he was not first ordained a deacon in the Roman Catholic Church and that Pope John Paul II's personal instruction was that he should be ordained immediately to the priesthood sub conditione. He was later appointed a papal chaplain with the title Monsignor and then a prelate of honour by the Pope on 3 August 2000.

Family
Leonard was the brother-in-law to the academic Michael Swann (Lord Swann of Coln St Denys) and Hugh Swann, cabinet maker to Elizabeth II of the United Kingdom, having married their sister, Priscilla Swann, in 1943. He and his wife had two sons.

National Portrait Gallery
Nine portraits of Leonard (1962 by Elliott & Fry and 1979 by Bassano and Vandyk) are owned by the National Portrait Gallery.

References

External links
Former Anglican Bishop of London explains why he became a Catholic
Bishops of Truro photo gallery
"Mgr Graham Leonard" – Daily Telegraph obituary
"Monsignor Graham Leonard" - Guardian obituary

1921 births
2010 deaths
20th-century Church of England bishops
20th-century English Roman Catholic priests
21st-century English Roman Catholic priests
Alumni of Balliol College, Oxford
Anglican bishop converts to Roman Catholicism
Anglo-Catholic bishops
Archdeacons of Hampstead
Bishops of London
Deans of the Chapel Royal
Bishops of Truro
Bishops of Willesden
British Army personnel of World War II
Knights Commander of the Royal Victorian Order
Members of the Privy Council of the United Kingdom
Oxfordshire and Buckinghamshire Light Infantry officers
People educated at Monkton Combe School
English Anglo-Catholics
Married Roman Catholic clergy